Manley is a civil parish in Cheshire West and Chester, England. It is entirely rural, and contains nine buildings that are recorded in the National Heritage List for England as designated listed buildings, all of which are at Grade II. This is the lowest of the three grades, which contains "buildings of national importance and special interest". The major building in the parish is the former Crossley Hospital East. This building is listed, together with five structures relating to it. The other listed buildings are two houses, and a former dovecot.

Buildings

See also
Listed buildings in Alvanley
Listed buildings in Ashton Hayes
Listed buildings in Barrow
Listed buildings in Delamere
Listed buildings in Dunham-on-the-Hill
Listed buildings in Frodsham
Listed buildings in Kingsley
Listed buildings in Mouldsworth
Listed buildings in Norley

References
Citations

Sources

Listed buildings in Cheshire West and Chester
Lists of listed buildings in Cheshire